Greenhouse Canada is the only national business magazine published exclusively for the commercial greenhouse grower in Canada. It is a monthly magazine based in Simcoe, Ontario.

History and profile
The magazine was established in 1980 and the publisher was the Growth Publications. The first issue was just 1,600 copies. It is published monthly. Its headquarters is in Simcoe, Ontario.

See also
List of horticultural magazines

References

External links
 Official website

1980 establishments in Ontario
Business magazines published in Canada
Monthly magazines published in Canada
Trade magazines published in Canada
Gardening in Canada
Horticultural magazines
Magazines established in 1980
Magazines published in Ontario
Norfolk County, Ontario